Srednja Kanomlja (literally, 'middle Kanomlja'; cf. Spodnja Kanomlja 'lower Kanomlja') is a dispersed settlement in the Kanomljica Valley (along Kanomljica Creek, a small tributary of the Idrijca River named after Kanomlja) west of Spodnja Idrija in the Municipality of Idrija, Slovenia. The village formerly included the hamlet of Kanomeljsko Razpotje (literally, 'Kanomlja crossroads'), now Razpotje.

References

External links
Srednja Kanomlja on Geopedia

Populated places in the Municipality of Idrija